Goran Jevtić may refer to:

 Goran Jevtić (actor), Serbian actor
 Goran Jevtić (footballer), Serbian footballer